Simeon Spicer ( – March 6, 1908) was an American politician from Maryland. He served as a member of the Maryland House of Delegates, representing Harford County in 1867.

Early life
Simeon Spicer was born in Harford County, Maryland, to Eliza and Abraham Spicer.

Career
Spicer served in the 7th Maryland Infantry Regiment of the Union Army in the Civil War. He reached the rank of captain.

Spicer served as a member of the Maryland House of Delegates, representing Harford County in 1867.

Spicer worked as an inspector at the Baltimore Customs House for 23 years.

Personal life
Spicer married Adelaide Guyton. They had two daughters and one son, Esther, Arabelle and R. Barclay. Spicer was an elder in the Park Avenue Meeting House of Friends.

Spicer died of pneumonia on March 6, 1908, at the age of 72, at his home at 2004 Park Avenue in Baltimore. He was buried in Fallston.

References

Year of birth uncertain
1830s births
1908 deaths
People from Harford County, Maryland
Politicians from Baltimore
Union Army officers
People of Maryland in the American Civil War
Members of the Maryland House of Delegates
Deaths from pneumonia in Maryland